Thanga Thamaraigal is a 1991 Indian Tamil language drama film, directed by V. Azhagappan and produced by Gangai Film Circuit. The film stars Arjun and Rupini. It was released on 23 March 1991. The film was later dubbed in Telugu as Gang Fighter.

Cast
Arjun as Ram
Rupini as Latha
Ilavarasi
Janagaraj
Livingston as Satish
Swaminathan as Moorthy

Soundtrack

The film score and the soundtrack were composed by Ilaiyaraaja. The soundtrack, released in 1991, features 6 tracks.

References

1991 films
1990s Tamil-language films
Indian drama films
Films scored by Ilaiyaraaja
Films directed by V. Azhagappan
1991 drama films